Salto Mortale is a 1931 German drama film directed by Ewald André Dupont and starring Anna Sten, Anton Walbrook and Reinhold Bernt. A circus film, it has been described as being "in all but name a sound film remake of Variety" and was a box office success.

The film's sets were designed by the art directors Alfred Junge and Fritz Maurischat. It was made at the Babelelsberg Studios in Berlin. Location filming took place at the Circus Busch in the city. A separate French-language version was also made by Dupont.

Cast 
 Anna Sten as Marina 
 Anton Walbrook as Robby - gennant Studienrat 
 Reinhold Bernt as Jim 
 Otto Wallburg as Pressechef 
 Kurt Gerron as Grimby 
 Grethe Weiser as Robbys Freundin

References

Bibliography
 Bergfelder, Tim & Cargnelli, Christian. Destination London: German-speaking emigrés and British cinema, 1925-1950. Berghahn Books, 2008.

External links

1931 films
1931 drama films
German drama films
Films of the Weimar Republic
1930s German-language films
Films directed by E. A. Dupont
Circus films
German black-and-white films
1931 multilingual films
German multilingual films
1930s German films
Films shot at Babelsberg Studios